The Legislative Council is the upper chamber of Tynwald, the legislature of the Isle of Man. The abbreviation "LegCo" is often used.

It consists of eleven members (MLCs):
 Eight members elected by the House of Keys
 Three ex officio members:
 President of Tynwald, ex officio President of the Legislative Council (casting vote)
 Bishop of Sodor and Man
 Attorney General for the Isle of Man (non-voting)

Historically, most or all elected MLCs were former MHKs, but this practice has now much reduced or ceased.

Formerly, the Lieutenant Governor presided over the Legislative Council and over Tynwald Court (a joint session of the Council and the House of Keys). Now, however, the President of Tynwald, who is chosen by the whole Tynwald for a five-year term, is the ex officio President of the Legislative Council, and presides over both the Legislative Council and Tynwald Court, except that the Lieutenant Governor presides once a year on Tynwald Day.

Furthermore, the Church of England Bishop of Sodor and Man and the Attorney General have seats on the Legislative Council. The Bishop is a voting member, the Attorney General is a non-voting member, and the President has the casting vote.

The Council does not usually originate legislation (until recently the last Act originating from the Council was the Sharing of Church Buildings Act 1986). Instead, it reviews draft legislation originating from the House of Keys. However, it is possible for legislation to originate in the Council: a recent example is the Equality Act 2017.

Method of election
The MLCs are elected by the members of the House of Keys for a term of five years. Four MLCs retire at a time, and four new MLCs are then elected. An MLC must be at least 21 years old and resident in the Isle of Man. Historically the election procedure has been cumbersome, and on some occasions in recent years the election has required many ballots, stretching over a period of weeks or even months. However the Standing Orders of the House of Keys regarding the election of MLCs were amended on 4 April 2017, and a relevant Guidance Note was issued by the Speaker of the House of Keys in June 2017. In 2018, only one ballot was required, although some felt that that was at the cost of allowing members to vote for an excessive number of candidates (one member voted for 13 candidates out of 15 and another for 11).

A motion was proposed in the Keys on 28 January 2020, shortly before the 2020 MLC election, which would have prevented MHKs voting for more candidates than there are places to be filled, but this was rejected. In 2020, again only one ballot was required, and members voted for an average of about 4 candidates each.

2016 Review of the Functioning of Tynwald
For many years there has been considerable debate about the functioning of Tynwald, and specifically about the composition, method of election, and functions of the Legislative Council. In the past, a number of reforms were made in the composition of the Legislative Council, which are set out below. In 2016 Lord Lisvane was asked to carry out a review of the functioning of Tynwald. Among his recommendations were:

 Members of the Legislative Council should continue not to be directly elected, but instead should be nominated by an independent Nominations Commission to the House of Keys. No sitting MHK could be nominated.
 The Legislative Council should not vote on taxation or appropriation.
 Only exceptionally should MLCs be ministers.
 The Bishop should continue as an ex officio voting member of the Legislative Council.

However there has been little action to implement these recommendations.

1990 reform and current composition
The Lieutenant Governor was removed as Presiding Officer of Tynwald and replaced by a member of Tynwald elected by the Members of the High Court of Tynwald as President of Tynwald. (Currently only MHKs are electors.) The President of Tynwald is also a member of the Legislative Council and presides at its sittings. The members are thus:

President of Tynwald
Attorney General
Bishop of Sodor and Man
Eight members elected by the House of Keys

The non-ex officio members are elected by the House of Keys for terms which end at the end of February immediately before the fifth anniversary of their election.

Current membership

Membership of the council since 1990

Past membership

Historical composition

Original

The original function of the Legislative Council was executive (i.e. giving advice to the Lieutenant Governor — or Lords of Mann prior to Revestment) and its membership was entirely appointed, as follows:

Lieutenant Governor 
Bishop of Sodor and Man
First Deemster
Second Deemster
Clerk of the Rolls (Position amalgamated with the First Deemster in 1918.)
Attorney General
Receiver General
Water Bailiff (position dissolved 1885)
Archdeacon of Sodor and Man
Vicar General of Sodor and Man (At various times there were two of these.)
Historically the "Comptroller" (a position sometimes held together with another office such as that of Receiver-General) and an "Archdeacon's Official" were also members.
Before the Reformation the Council included other prelates, such as the Abbot of Rushen.

The first seven were Crown appointments and the last two appointments by the Bishop. Reforms were slowly made to reduce the number of judicial and religious appointments and these members were slowly replaced by indirectly elected members.

1917 reform

In 1917, the Judicature (Amendment) Act introduced by the Legislative Council removed Clerk of the Rolls from the composition of the Council. It then consisted of the following members:

 Lieutenant Governor
 Bishop of Sodor and Man
 First Deemster
 Second Deemster
 Attorney General
 Receiver General
 Archdeacon of Sodor and Man
 Vicar General of Sodor and Man

1919 reform

In 1919, The Archdeacon; the Vicar General; and the Receiver General were removed as ex officio members of the Council by the Isle of Man Constitution Amendment Act 1919.  The members were thus:

Lieutenant Governor
First Deemster
Second Deemster
Attorney General
Bishop of Sodor and Man
Two members appointed by the Lieutenant Governor
Four members elected by the House of Keys

1961 reform

Increased the number of elected members from four to five.

1965 reform
The Second Deemster lost his seat in the Council.  The members were thus:

Lieutenant Governor
First Deemster
Attorney General
Bishop of Sodor and Man
Two members appointed by the Lieutenant Governor
Five members elected by the House of Keys

1969 reform

The Isle of Man Constitution Act 1969 removed the two appointed members of the Legislative Council. The members were thus:

 Lieutenant Governor
 First Deemster
 Attorney General
 Bishop of Sodor and Man
 Seven members elected by the House of Keys

1971 reform
The Isle of Man Constitution Act 1971 removed the Attorney-General's vote, and he no longer counted towards a quorum.

1975 reform
The First Deemster lost his seat in the Council, by virtue of the Isle of Man Constitution (Amendment) Act 1975.  The members were thus:

Lieutenant Governor
Attorney General
Bishop of Sodor and Man
Eight members elected by the House of Keys

1980 reform
The Lieutenant Governor was removed as Presiding Officer and replaced by an indirectly elected President of the Legislative Council. The Governor still presided at joint sittings of Tynwald.  The members were thus:

President of the Legislative Council
Attorney General
Bishop of Sodor and Man
Eight members elected by the House of Keys

References

Government of the Isle of Man
Politics of the Isle of Man
Man
Tynwald